Comahuesuchus is an extinct genus of notosuchian crocodylomorphs from the Santonian Bajo de la Carpa Formation of Argentina. It was described by palaeontologist José Bonaparte in 1991. The type species is C. brachybuccalis.

Classification 

The holotype of C. brachybuccalis is MUCPv-202. Comahuesuchus is the name-sake of the clade Comahuesuchidae. Sereno et al. (2003) suggested that Comahuesuchus and Anatosuchus are both comahuesuchids, but work by Martinelli and Andrade et al. (2006), has suggested that A. minor is not a comahuesuchid. Comahuesuchus seems instead to be more closely related to Mariliasuchus.

References

Bibliography 
 Andrade, M.B.; Bertini, R. J. ; Pinheiro, A. E. P. (2006). Observations on the palate and choanae structures in Mesoeucrocodylia (Archosauria, Crocodylomorpha): phylogenetic implications. Revista Brasileira de Paleontologia, Sociedade Brasileira de Paleontologia 9 (3): 323–332.
 Sereno, P. C., Sidor, C. A., Larsson, H. C. E., and Gado, B. (2003). A new notosuchian from the Early Cretaceous of Niger. Journal of Vertebrate Paleontology 23 (2): 477–482.

External links 
 Andrade et al. (2006)
 Sereno et al. (2003)
 The Paleobiology Database

Ziphosuchians
Santonian life
Late Cretaceous crocodylomorphs of South America
Cretaceous Argentina
Fossils of Argentina
Bajo de la Carpa Formation
Fossil taxa described in 1991
Prehistoric pseudosuchian genera